XHPU-FM is a noncommercial radio station on 97.1 FM in Monclova, Coahuila. It is operated by GRM Radio and known as La PU.

History
XEPU-AM 1110 received its permit on August 11, 1982 and was licensed to operate with 250 watts as a daytimer. It later migrated to FM.

XEPU is one of the few permit stations to hold a four-letter callsign and one of the first to operate in conjunction with commercial stations (in this case, XHMDA-FM 104.9).

References

Radio stations in Coahuila